PSO may refer to:

In music:
Pacific Symphony Orchestra
Peoria Symphony Orchestra
Pittsburgh Symphony Orchestra
Plano Symphony Orchestra
Portland Symphony Orchestra
Perth Symphony Orchestra (Western Australia)

In science and technology:
 Particle swarm optimization, a swarm intelligence optimization technique
 Password Settings Object, used in Windows Active Directory environments
 Phase-shift oscillator, an electronic circuit that generates sine waves
 Protocol Support Organization, one of the three initial components of ICANN, later disbanded
 PSO J318.5-22, a rogue planet discovered in 2013

Other uses:
 Pakistan State Oil
 Patient safety organization
 Paysite operator, the operator of a paysite, typically pornographic
 Peace Support Operations, a military term used by NATO
 Penalty shootout, a method of determining a winner in sports matches which would have otherwise been drawn or tied
 Phantasy Star Online, a series of online role-playing video games
 Phantasy Star Online, the first game in the series
 Phone sex operator, a person who provides phone sex service
 Producers Sales Organization, an independent motion picture production and distribution company
 Protective services officer, a member of police in Australia who performs policing duties at specific locations
 Psoriasis, an autoimmune disease
 PSO-1, a Soviet telescopic sight
 Public Safety Officer, another name for police, firefighters, ambulance crews and other providing safety services in the U.S.
 Public Service Company of Oklahoma
 Public service obligation, a form of state subsidy for transport links which are not commercially viable
 Puro Sangue Orientale, a breed of horse in Italy
 The FAA LID code for Stevens Field airport in Archuleta County, Colorado, United States.
 The IATA code for Antonio Nariño Airport, serving the Colombian city of Pasto
 It also refers to Personal Security Officers.
 Provider Services Operations, a team at the National Marrow Donor Program